The Tainan City Government is the municipal government  of Tainan, Taiwan. It was formed after the merger of Tainan County and Tainan City in December 2010. Its chief administrator is the directly elected Mayor of Tainan.

Administration

Mayor 

The mayor of Tainan City is the chief executive officer of the city. The mayor is elected for a four-year term and limited to serving no more than two terms. Under the mayor there are 2 deputy mayors, 1 secretary-general, 1 deputy secretary-general and 27 principal officers.

Bureaus

Bureau of Civil Affairs
Bureau of Education 
Bureau of Agriculture 
Bureau of Economic Development 
Bureau of Tourism 
Bureau of Public Works 
Bureau of Water Resources 
Bureau of Social Affairs 
Bureau of Labor 
Bureau of Land Administration 
Bureau of Urban development 
Bureau of Cultural Affairs 
Bureau of Transportation
Bureau of Health 
Bureau of Environmental Protection 
Bureau of Local Tax 
Fire Bureau
Police Department

Department
Department of Finance 
Department of Legal Affairs 
Department of Information and International Relations
Department of Personnel
Department of Budget, Accounting and Statistics

Offices
Office of Civil Service Ethics 
Secretariat

Commissions
Ethnic Affairs Commission
Research, Development and Evaluation Commission

See also
 Tainan City Council
 Mayor of Tainan
 Tainan City

References

External links

 Tainan City Government

Local governments of the Republic of China